Abdelmoumen Kherbache (born 20 November 1986 in Algeria) is an Algerian professional footballer. He currently plays as a defender for the Algerian Algerian Ligue Professionnelle 2 club OM Arzew.

References

1986 births
Living people
Algerian footballers
Olympique de Médéa players
USM Blida players
Algerian Ligue Professionnelle 1 players
Algerian Ligue 2 players
Footballers from Algiers
NARB Réghaïa players
Association football defenders
21st-century Algerian people